Gustavo Adolfo Somohano Winfield (3 April 1925 – 30 September 2004) was a Mexican diver. He competed in the men's 10 metre platform event at the 1948 Summer Olympics.

Notes

References

External links
 

1925 births
2004 deaths
Mexican male divers
Olympic divers of Mexico
Divers at the 1948 Summer Olympics
Sportspeople from Monterrey